Blepharomastix pallidipennis is a moth in the family Crambidae. It is found in Brazil.

The wingspan is about 25 mm. The forewings are semihyaline whitish with a faint yellowish tinge. The costa and hind margin are diffusely bronzy grey with brownish lines. There is a very strong brown lunular mark on the discocellular, and a minute dot immediately beyond the first line. The hindwings are bronzy grey along the hind margin, with a distinct central brown spot and the exterior line of the forewings is repeated.

References

Moths described in 1889
Blepharomastix